Major General William Hartshorne Johnston Jr. (October 19, 1861 –	 February 19, 1933) was a United States Army officer who served his country with distinction for almost forty years, being involved in the Spanish–American War, the Philippine–American War and World War I. He attained the rank of major general, and was most notable for his World War I command of the 91st "Wild West" Division.

Early life
William Hartshorne Johnston Jr. was born in Cincinnati, Ohio, a son of Mary (Neele) Johnston and Colonel William Hartshorne Johnston, a U.S. Army paymaster. He was raised and educated at various Army posts and in St. Louis, Missouri, and attended Washington University School of Law from 1876 to 1879. While living in St. Louis, Johnston also worked as a salesman for the Scudders-Gale Grocery Company.

Military career

Militia service
Johnston enlisted in the Missouri Militia in 1878, and rose to sergeant in the Lafayette Guard of St. Louis before moving to Prescott, Arizona in 1881. While in Arizona, he obtained a commission as a first lieutenant in the territorial militia's Prescott Rifles company, and he served until 1883. From November 1881 to October 1883, he was an Army paymaster's clerk.

In February 1883, Johnston was a resident of New York City when he competed for a Congressional appointment to the United States Military Academy. He was selected by a panel that made a recommendation to Representative Roswell P. Flower, but was subsequently declared ineligible because he did not meet the one-year state residency requirement. In July 1883, he was appointed a second lieutenant in the United States Army directly from civil life, subject to completion of an examination by a board of officers. When Johnston took the competitive examination, he placed first of 96 candidates. His commission in the 16th Infantry Regiment was confirmed in October.

Spanish–American War and Philippine–American War
In 1887, Johnston graduated with honors from the Infantry and Cavalry School at Fort Leavenworth, Kansas. While assigned to the faculty of first Western Military Academy in Alton, Illinois and later Saint Louis University, Johnston attended law school at Washington University in St. Louis. He was a student beginning in 1894, graduated in 1897, and received his LL.B. degree. At graduation, Johnston was awarded the honor of Prize Essayist of his senior class.

During the Spanish–American War, Johnston served with the 46th U.S. Volunteer Infantry as a major. Following the conflict, Johnston was mustered out of the volunteer service and was appointed military governor of Isabela Province on the Philippine island of Luzon, a post which he held from 1901 to 1902.

During the Philippine–American War, Johnston commanded the 1st Battalion of Philippine Scouts from 1904 to 1906 during the campaign against the Pulajanes, for which he was awarded the Silver Star. He returned to the U.S. in 1907 to attend the Army War College until 1908.

World War I

William Johnston was a member of the General Staff at the United States Army War College from 1914 to 1917. Following the American entry into World War I in April 1917, he was promoted to brigadier general and assigned to command the 180th Brigade, a unit of the 90th Division. He organized and trained the brigade, which he led to France. After arriving on the Western Front in August 1918, Johnston's brigade was stationed in the Toul Sector as part of  I Corps.

In late August Johnston was succeeded in command of the 180th Brigade by Brigadier General Ulysses G. McAlexander and was assigned to command the 91st Division, taking over from Brigadier General Frederick Steinman Foltz, who had been in temporary command. Having been promoted to divisional command, Johnston was soon promoted to major general. Under his command, and aided by Colonel Herbert J. Brees as his chief of staff, the 91st Division took part in the St. Mihiel offensive and the Meuse–Argonne offensive, for which he was awarded both the Distinguished Service Cross (DSC) (the second highest military decoration in the United States Armed Forces) along with the Army Distinguished Service Medal, and the Ypres-Lys campaign. The citation for his DSC reads:

The Army DSM states the following:

For his leadership in the war, which ended on November 11, 1918, Johnston was additionally awarded the French Legion of Honor (Commander) and Croix de Guerre with Palm, the Belgian Order of Leopold I (Commander) and the Victory Medal.

Inter-war years

The 91st Division was demobilized in early 1919. Johnston returned briefly to the Army War College's General Staff before deploying once more to Germany in 1920 as part of the American forces occupying Germany. Over the next three years, Johnston played key roles in the occupying force, including chief of staff of American Forces in Germany until 1921, commanding officer of the 1st Brigade until 1922 and as general liaison officer to the French Army of the Rhine until 1923.

Johnston returned to the U.S. in 1923 to command the Fourth Coast Artillery District at Fort McPherson, Georgia. The following year, he assumed command of the 3rd Infantry Division, which he led until his retirement in 1925.

Family
In June 1888, Johnston married Lucille Barat Wilkinson (1869-1917), a great-granddaughter of Major General James Wilkinson. In 1923, Johnston married Isabelle Gros in Paris, France.

With his first wife, Johnston was the father of a daughter, Genevieve. Genevieve Johnston lived in St. Louis, and became a nun at Villa Duchesne Convent of the Sacred Heart in St. Louis.

Retirement and death
In retirement, Johnston resided in Nice, France. He died in Nice on February 19, 1933, after he suffered a heart attack while attending a Red Cross ball. A memorial service was held in the chapel at Walter Reed Army Medical Center. He was buried at Arlington National Cemetery, and the honorary pallbearers included generals Stephen O. Fuqua, Harry L. Gilchrist, Samuel Hof, Lytle Brown, John W. Gulick, and Oscar Westover.

Notes

References

External links

Arlington National Cemetery

1861 births
1933 deaths
United States Army generals
Washington University School of Law alumni
United States Army War College alumni
People from Cincinnati
Recipients of the Distinguished Service Cross (United States)
Recipients of the Croix de Guerre 1914–1918 (France)
Order of Leopold (Belgium)
Recipients of the Distinguished Service Medal (US Army)
Burials at Arlington National Cemetery
United States Army generals of World War I
Saint Louis University faculty
Military personnel from Ohio
United States Army Infantry Branch personnel